Eluru is a city and the district headquarters of  Eluru district  in the Indian state of Andhra Pradesh. It is one of the 14 municipal corporations in the state and the mandal headquarters of Eluru mandal in the Eluru revenue division. The city is on the Tammileru river. The city is well known for its wool-pile carpets and hand woven products. Its history dates back to the second century CE.
It is part of Kalinga Kingdom and later it was the capital of Vengi Kingdom. As on date Eluru urban agglomeration has a population of 3,800,000.

Etymology 
It used to be part of the ancient Kalinga Kingdom and later became part of the Vengi Kingdom. During the rule of the Buddhist kingdom of Vengi, it was the capital city and was known as 'Helapuri'.  It was also known as 'Ellore'. To distinguish with Vellore, which was having same pronunciation during Nizam rule, Ellore was referred as Uppu Ellore (i.e. Salt Ellore), while the former one was referred as Ra Vellore or Raya Vellore.

History

Ancient History 
The history of Eluru dates back to the second century CE and has great prominence in the history of Andhra. Vengi near Eluru was the capital of Andhra from the second century to the twelfth century, ruled by Salankayanas, Vishnukudinas, and Eastern Chalukyas. Vengi was the capital city of Andhradesa for more years than any other city in Andhra Pradesh. Eluru was part of the Buddhist kingdom of Vengi.

Salankayanas

Salankayana ruled from the third century CE to the fifth century CE. They were known as Salankayana after the Gotra name and were the feudatories of Ikshvakus. They ruled near the Vengi area, with Vengi (Eluru) as the capital. Salankayana is another of the Phantom kingdoms of Andhra for Indologists. Their date is fixed based on Samudra Gupta inscription mention of Hastivarman of Vengi.

Vishnukundina

Eluru was a major city of the Vishnukundinas. Vishnukundin reign might be fixed between the end of the Salankayana and the rise of the Eastern Chalukyan power in 624 AD. In the late fifth century, the Salankayanas were conquered by Madhavarma II of the Vishnukundinas. During the reign of Madhava Varma the Great, they became independent and conquered coastal Andhra from the Salankayanas and might have shifted their capital to a place in coastal Andhra.

Eastern Chalukyas 

Eastern Chalukyas, or Chalukyas of Vengi, were a dynasty of South India whose kingdom was in the present day Andhra Pradesh. Their capital was Vengi near Eluru and their dynasty lasted around 500 years from the seventh century until c. 1130 C.E., when the Vengi kingdom merged with the Chola empire. The Vengi kingdom continued to be ruled by the Eastern Chalukyas (Eastern Chalukyan kings) under the protection of the Chola empire until 1189 C.E., when the kingdom succumbed to the Hoysalas and the Yadavas. They had their capital originally at Vengi, now Pedavegi, near Eluru of the West Godavari district and was later changed to Rajamahendravaram (Rajahmundry).

13th century to 16th century 

Eluru was captured by the Kakatiyas and then became a part of the Kalinga Empire until 1471. Later, it fell into the hands of the Gajapatis. In 1515, Srikrishnadevaraya captured it. After the fall of the Vijayanagara Kingdom, it was taken by the Sultan of Golkonda, Kutub Shah. Mohammedans built the fort at Eluru from the ruins of Vengi.

Modern history 

Salabat Jung, the fourth Nizam of Hyderabad, granted, in 1753, the region including Eluru to the French East India Company. But, the French were forced to transfer it to the British within a few years. During British rule, Eluru was a military station and the capital of the Northern Circars, a division of the Madras Presidency. In the Madras Presidency, the District of Rajahmundry was created in 1823. It was reorganized in 1859 and was bifurcated into Godavari and Machilipatnam districts. Eluru was a part of Machilipatnam district after the division of the Northern Circars. In 1859, it was included in the Godavari district; later, it was made a part of the Krishna district. During British rule, Rajahmundry was the headquarters of the Godavari district, which was further bifurcated into East Godavari and West Godavari districts in 1925. When the Godavari district was divided, Eluru became the headquarters of West Godavari.

In early December 2020, a mystery illness in Eluru killed one person and more than 400 were hospitalised. Preliminary results indicate the cause to be water and milk contaminated by lead and nickel.

Geography 

It lies on the Eastern coastal plains. It is about halfway between the Krishna and Godavari rivers and about 50 kilometers inland from the Bay of Bengal. The Tammileru river and the Krishna and Godavari canals pass through the city, before the river. The Eluru canal from Krishna empties into Kolleru Lake near the city.

Climate 

Eluru experiences hot and humid climate due to its proximity to the shore of Bay of Bengal. May is the hottest and December is the coolest month of the year. Temperature crosses  in summer.

Demographics 

 census of India, Eluru Municipal Corporation had a population of 214,414 of which 105,707 were male and 108,707 female, whilst Eluru urban agglomeration had a population of 250,693. The estimated city population during 2015–16, period was 350,000.

Governance

Civic administration 

Eluru Municipal Corporation is the civic body of Eluru. It was first constituted as a municipality in 1866. It was upgraded to Municipal Corporation on 9 April 2005 from selection grade municipality.

The present Municipal Commissioner of the city is Y.Sai Sreekanth and the Mayor is Shaik Noorjahan. In 2015, as per the 'Swachh Bharat Abhiyan' of the Ministry of Urban Development, Eluru Municipal Corporation was ranked 249th in the country.

Law and order in Eluru is maintained with the help of eight police stations, which includes one woman and one traffic police station. These are under the jurisdiction of the 'Additional Judicial First Class Magistrate'.

Politics 
Eluru (Assembly constituency) is one of the constituencies for Andhra Pradesh Legislative Assembly. Alla Nani is the present MLA of the constituency from YSR Congress Party. The constituency falls under Eluru (Lok Sabha constituency) which was won by Kotagiri Sridhar of the same party. The city is going to be the head office for the Jana Sena Party.

Economy 

Since the 17th century, Eluru was known for rug weaving, derived from weavers of Iranian descendants. R.R.Pet, Powerpet, Eluru 1-Town area are the commercial centres. Tangellamudi, Sanivarapupeta and Lakshavarapupeta areas of the city are known for the wool pile carpet industry. The eco-friendly carpets are exported to countries like the United States, Australia, Germany and the United Kingdom.

Culture 

An antique museum is being set up in the city, that will preserve prehistoric tools, idols, and elements found in the archaeological excavations near the city.

Notable personalities 

The personalities from Eluru include Kommareddi Suryanarayana, a Rajya Sabha and Lok Sabha member in Indian Parliament and Indian freedom activist; Murali Mohan, a member of parliament and Telugu film actor, producer and business executive; Duvvuri Subbarao, an Economist and the 22nd Governor of the Reserve Bank of India; Justice Muhammad Shahabuddin, Judge Federal Court of Pakistan and Governor East Pakistan; Kurma Venkata Reddy Naidu, a lawyer, professor, Justice Party leader, Governor and Chief Minister of Madras Presidency; Chodagam Ammanna Raja, Indian freedom movement activist and Rajya Sabha member; Mothey Vedakumari, parliamentarian and singer; V. S. Ramadevi, the first woman to become Chief Election Commissioner of India; Pawan Kumar, former cricketer for Andhra and Hyderabad.

People from film industry are L. V. Prasad, film producer, actor, director, cinematographer and businessman; Pasupuleti Kannamba, actress, playback singer and film producer of Telugu cinema; Vijaya Bapineedu, magazine editor, film screenwriter and director; V. N. Aditya, film director and screenwriter; Sekhar Kammula, film director, screenwriter and producer; Silk Smitha, film actress; Naga Shaurya, film actor; Shanmukha Srinivas, film actor and an accomplished Kuchipudi dancer.

Cityscape 

Eluru Buddha Park is in the city and is notable for its  Buddha statue in the Abhaya posture, in the heart of Gaja Vallivari Cheruvu tank which was used as drinking water source for elephants in the Ancient Era.

Kolleru Lake is a very large ( to ) but shallow fresh-water lake, about 15 km from the city. The lake is known for attracting migratory birds from Northern Europe and Northern Asia during the months of October–March and is designated as the Kolleru Bird Sanctuary.  As of 2018, the water level has been low in recent years.

The "Holy Land" of Israel has been replicated on the premises of Fr. Silvio Pasquali Memorial Convent at Duggirala on the city outskirts.

 Tammileru
 Guntupalli Group of Buddhist Monuments
 Sultan Quli mosque
 Sanivarapupeta
 S.V. Rangarao statue

Neighbourhoods 
The city has neighbourhoods including Ramachandrarao Pet (R.R. Pet), Narasimharao Pet (N.R. Pet), Pathebada, One-Town (1-Town), Powerpet, Satrampadu, Sanivarapupeta, Vatluru.

Transport 

Public transport systems in the city and for long-distance travel include government run APSRTC buses, privately operated auto rickshaws, cabs, mini-buses etc. Every day, around 4000 auto rickshaws flee on city roads. National Highway 16, a part of Asian Highway 45 and Golden Quadrilateral highway network, bypasses the city and connects Kolkata with Chennai. GNT Road, Mini-Bypass Road, Canal Road and Sanivarapupeta Road are the major internal arterial roads.

NH216A , is a Spur road of NH16 starts from Eluru Bypass near vatluru  connecting Gundugolanu , Bhimadole ,  Pulla , Kaikaram , Chebrolu ,  Unguturu , Tadepalligudem , Duvva ,  Tanuku , Peravali , Khanadavalli , Siddantham,  Ravulapalem , Vemagiri  , Kadiyapulanka and ends at Rajahmundry .

APSRTC operates its bus services from Eluru Old and Eluru New bus stations to parts of the State Vijayawada, Rajahmundry , Guntur, Nellore, Visakhapatnam , Tirupati , Srikakulam , Tekkali Palasa , Tanuku , Annavaram , Tadepalligudem  , Kovvur , Kakinada , Tuni ,  vizianagaram , Salur , Parvathipuram , Palakonda Kaikaluru  , Bhimavaram  , Palakollu , Narsapuram , Gudivada , Machilipatnam ,  Jangareddigudem , Nuzvid , Hanuman junction  , Srisailam , Narsaraopeta , Ongole , and to other states (mostly Hyderabad , Khammam , Bhadrachalam , Aswaraopeta , Banglore , Gangavathi , Raichuru). State Highway 43 and State Highway 44 connect Eluru with Sathupalli and Jangareddygudem respectively.

Eluru railway station is classified as an 'A–category station' in the Vijayawada railway division of South Coast Railway zone. All these stations are on the Howrah-Chennai main line. Eluru is one of the top 100 booking stations of Indian railways. Nearest Airport to Eluru city is Gannavaram Airport which is 35 km from Eluru City.

Indian National Waterway 4 (NW-4) is under development. It runs along the Northern Circars through Kakinada, Rajamahendravaram, Eluru, Commanur, Buckingham Canal, and part of the Krishna and Godavari rivers in South India.

Sports 
 ASR Stadium was named after Alluri Sitarama Raju
Cricket and soccer are the most popular sports in the city. Presently, the city has four stadium out of which Indoor Stadium and ASR Stadium hosted for Ranji Trophy in 1977. Other popular stadiums are Helapuri grounds, C.R. Reddy Cricket Stadium.

Alluri Sitarama Raju Stadium 
It had earlier hosted a Ranji Trophy match, handball, football and hockey tournaments. The ground first held a single first-class match in 1976 when Andhra Pradesh played Hyderabad in the 1976/77 Ranji Trophy, which ended in a draw. It held Finals of Football League of West Godavari Matches in 2016. Current DSDO is Syed Azeez.

Education 
Eluru plays a major role in education for urban and rural students from nearby villages. It has an average literacy rate of 83.90% with, according to the 2011 census, a total number of 155,894 who are literate. This includes, 80,434 men (88.13%) and 75,460 women (79.82%).

Primary and secondary school education is provided by government, aided, and private schools, under the School Education Department of Andhra Pradesh. According to the school information report for the academic year 2016–17, the urban area has around 160 schools. These include government, residential, private, municipal, and other types of schools. There are more than 100 private schools and 49 municipal schools. There are more than 30,000 students in these schools.

Instruction is in English, Urdu, and Telugu.

Sri Chintalapati Varaprasada Murthy Raju was the founder of Chintalpati Satyavathi Devi College (St. Therisa College) and three high schools in the name of Indian freedom fighters: Kasturiba Girls High School, Balagangadhar Tilak Oriental for Sanskrit, Duggirala Gopal Krishnayya. Moulana Abdul Kalam Azad High School (the only school with Urdu as medium of instruction in the district). The Central Board of Secondary Education, Secondary School Certificate, or the Indian Certificate of Secondary Education are the types of syllabus followed by schools.

The government plans to set up Municipal Corporation Junior College in the city. Eluru city has ASRAM Medical college, St Joseph Dental College, Sir C.R. Reddy Degree College, Sir C.R. Reddy College of Engineering, Eluru College of Engineering and Technology, Ramachandra College of Engineering, Nova College, Helapuri Engineering College are Engineering colleges present in and around Eluru.

Sir C.R. Reddy College, situated in Eluru, has had many famous celebrity graduates. A few of them are Ghattamaneni Krishna, an actor in Telugu cinema and also Member of Parliament, Kota Srinivasa Rao, also an actor in Telugu Cinema and Member of the Legislative Assembly, D Subbarao, the former Governor of the Reserve Bank of India, etc.

Research 

The city is home for Indian Institute of Oil Palm Research.

See also 
 List of cities in Andhra Pradesh
 Kolleru Bird Sanctuary

References

External links 

 Eluru Municipal Corporation website
 

 
Cities in Andhra Pradesh
Mandal headquarters in West Godavari district
District headquarters of Andhra Pradesh
Archaeological sites in Andhra Pradesh
Ancient Indian cities
Hindu holy cities
Former capital cities in India
Cities and towns in Eluru district